Hlynur Atlason (born April 19, 1974 in Reykjavik, Iceland) is an Icelandic industrial designer based in New York City.

Career

Atlason’s career as a designer started at ten years old winning an essay competition for the Icelandic Ministry of Welfare, which resulted in an ad campaign and a slogan “Your teeth, Your choice”.  This ad campaign which was featured on buses all over Reykjavik and was used as an example in parliamentary discussions about healthcare in Iceland.

After living for some time in Copenhagen and two years in Paris studying at the Sorbonne and Parsons Paris, he moved to New York City to pursue a degree in Industrial Design at Parsons the New School for Design completing his degree in 2001.  Shortly before graduating from Parsons, Ikea produced his "Tuno" clock for their 2002 PS Collection.

After working for Boym Partners for a year and later becoming the director of product design for G2 Worldwide, Atlason left to start his own design practice in 2004.

Since founding his eponymous design studio, Atlason in 2004, he has led a team of creatives and strategists that collaborate with companies across a variety of industries. His professional projects are produced by major international manufacturers, which include furniture for Design Within Reach and Ercol, a female focused body razor for Billie, a condiment holder for the Museum of Modern Art, lighting for Artecnica and Hennepin Made and packing for Xbox and Stella Artois.

In addition to running his own studio, Atlason was hired as an adjunct lecturer at Parsons the New School for Design in 2014 and the School of Visual Arts in 2017.

His work has been published in various books and periodicals, with the most notable being The Design Encyclopedia a book published by the Museum of Modern Art, The International Design Year Book 18 edited by famed designer Karim Rashid, and On the Cutting Edge: Design in Iceland a book on Icelandic design curated by German design and art historian and curator Klaus Klemp. Several publications have also featured his work, among them Metropolis, I.D., Core77, Design Milk, Dwell, Wallpaper, Blueprint, The New York Times, Azure, and CBN weekly, Dagens Nyheter, Morgunblaðið, House Beautiful, Interior Design, Gearculture, Nordic Design, and Interni among others.

Exhibitions

2001 Public life, Private Realm, Parsons School of Design 
2001 and 2002 In Transit 1 & 2, Terminal Store, New York
2002 Make Room, Salone Satellite, Salone del Mobile, Milan.
2013 Artecnica, ICFF, New York
2014 Umbra Shift, ICFF, New York
2018 Von Collection for Ercol, Salone del Mobile, Milan.

Books
Work featured in the following:
2003 - International Design Yearbook 18 by Karim Rashid 2003 
2004 - Product Design 3 by B. Martin Pederson 2004 
2004 - The Design Encyclopedia: Museum of Modern Art by Mel Byars 2004 
2004 - New Scandinavian Design by Katherine Nelson, Raul Cabra 2004  
2011 - On the Cutting Edge: Design in Iceland by Klaus Klemp, Mathias Wagner 2011

References
Notes

Industrial designers
Parsons School of Design faculty
Hlynur Atlason
Hlynur Atlason
1974 births
Living people
Design educators